Katja Lange-Müller (born 13 February 1951) is a German writer living in Berlin. Her works include several short stories and novellas, radio dramas, and dramatic works.

The daughter of Inge Lange, an East German party functionary, Katja Lange-Müller was born in Berlin-Lichtenberg.  She was expelled from school at the age of 17 for "unsocialist" behavior.  From an early age, she and her circle of friends were carefully watched by the Stasi.  Prevented from attending college, she first learned to be a typesetter, and later worked as a nurse in a psychiatric clinic.  At the age of 28, she was accepted to the "Johannes R. Becher" Literature Institute in Leipzig, marking the beginning of her career as a writer.

Works

Awards
 Ingeborg Bachmann Prize, 1986
 Alfred Döblin Prize, 1995
 , 1996
 Preis der SWR-Bestenliste, 2001
 Mainzer Stadtschreiber of the city Mainz and the television station ZDF, 2002
 Roswitha Prize of the city Bad Gandersheim, 2002
 Kassel Literary Prize, 2005
 Kleist Prize, 2013

Memberships
 2000 Deutsche Akademie für Sprache und Dichtung, Darmstadt
 2002 Academy of Arts, Berlin
 2022

References

1951 births
Living people
People from Lichtenberg
People from East Berlin
Writers from Berlin
German women short story writers
German short story writers
20th-century German writers
20th-century German women writers
21st-century German writers
21st-century German women writers
20th-century German short story writers
21st-century short story writers
Members of the Academy of Arts, Berlin
Ingeborg Bachmann Prize winners